Police aviation is the use of aircraft in police operations. Police services commonly use aircraft for traffic control, ground support, search and rescue, high-speed car pursuits, observation, air patrol and control of large-scale public events and/or public order incidents. They may employ rotary-wing aircraft, fixed-wing aircraft, nonrigid-wing aircraft or lighter-than-air aircraft. In some major cities, police rotary-wing aircraft are also used as air transportation for personnel belonging to SWAT-style units. In large, sparsely populated areas, fixed-wing aircraft are sometimes used to transport personnel and equipment.

History
The first police aviation department was established in New York City. Fixed-wing aircraft have generally been replaced by more versatile rotary-wing aircraft since the late 1940s. However, fixed-wing aircraft are still used in some missions, such as border patrol, as their higher speed and greater operating altitude allow larger areas to be covered.

In 1921, the British airship R33 was used to help the police with traffic control around horse racing events at Epsom and Ascot.

A large mural on the side of St. George's Town Hall in the East End of London depicting the 1936 Battle of Cable Street public order incident includes the police autogyro, that was present during the incident, overhead.

Rotary-wing aircraft

The most common form of police rotary-wing aircraft is the helicopter, but other types of rotary-wing aircraft such as autogyros are also used. The Groen Hawk 4 autogyro was used during the 2002 Winter Olympics in Salt Lake City, Utah.

Police rotary-wing aircraft are sometimes equipped to perform multiple functions, or are designed so that equipment can be changed quickly when required for divergent roles. For example, a rotary-wing aircraft could be used for search-and-rescue, and then as an air ambulance.

Police forces sometimes use military surplus rotary-wing aircraft, such as the Bell UH-1 Huey. Some policing organisations, such as the Policía Federal in Mexico, acquire new military rotary-wing aircraft such as the Sikorsky UH-60 Black Hawk. However, most buy civilian rotary-wing aircraft directly from major aircraft companies or lease them from specialty suppliers.

Fixed-wing and nonrigid-wing aircraft

Some police air units also use fixed-wing aircraft, which allow higher and quieter surveillance, making it less likely that suspects will become aware they are being watched. A few police air units, such as the Northern Territory Police in Australia, use only fixed-wing aircraft. The use of fixed-wing aircraft also allows for longer flying times and incurs lower running costs.  Fixed-wing aircraft are also used to transport prisoners, with the Justice Prisoner and Alien Transportation System (nicknamed "Con Air") perhaps being the largest example of this use. Fixed-wing aircraft are also used to provide regular police patrols in remote communities and to transport investigators to remote crime scenes.  Light-sport aircraft and powered parachutes can sometimes be used to provide a cost-effective replacement for helicopters in the observation platform role.

The Edgley Optica was a British fixed-wing aircraft built for observation use and was used by the Hampshire Constabulary as an alternative to rotary-wing aircraft. The Britten-Norman Defender is used by the Greater Manchester Police, the Police Service of Northern Ireland and the Garda Síochána. The FBI deployed one Britten-Norman Defender for electronic aerial surveillance at the Branch Davidian compound during the Waco siege in 1993. In Greater London, the Metropolitan Police Service has, for a number of years, reportedly been secretly using Cessna aircraft that have been fitted with surveillance equipment capable of intercepting mobile telephone calls and listening in on conversations.

Lighter-than-air aircraft

Police blimps were used to patrol the sky during the 2004 Republican National Convention, the 1996 Atlanta Olympic Games and the 2004 Athens Olympic Games. The blimp Santos-Dumont, named for Alberto Santos-Dumont, operates in the Caribbean for the Special Anti-Crime Unit of Trinidad & Tobago (SAUTT), providing security surveillance. During April 2009, this blimp provided aerial surveillance of the 5th Summit of the Americas in Port-of-Spain.  Greater Manchester Police began trial operations of a blimp in 2010 to provide surveillance for major events, which would be a cheaper alternative to the use of a helicopter in the long term. However, the blimp was only used on 18 occasions because of weather-related operational problems.

Unmanned aerial vehicles

Police in some areas have started using unmanned aerial vehicles, or drones, for surveillance operations. Unmanned aerial vehicles come in both fixed-wing and rotary-wing types.

List of police aviation units 

Queensland Police Service
Western Australia Police Air Wing
New South Wales Police Force
Victoria Police Air Wing
Westpac Rescue Helicopter Tasmania
South Australia Police

Air Police (Austria)

Cyprus Police Aviation Unit

Hong Kong Government Flying Service

Iranian Police Aviation

Garda Air Support Unit

Royal Malaysian Police Air Wing Unit

Condor Group

Police Aviation Service

Macedonian police helicopter unit

Royal Oman Police - Police Aviation Directorate

National Aeronaval Service

Philippine National Police Air Unit

General Inspectorate of Aviation

Serbian police helicopter unit

South African Police Service Air Wing

National Airborne Service Corps

National Police Air Service 
Police Scotland Air Support Unit 
Police Service of Northern Ireland Air Support Unit

Many local, state, and federal US law enforcement agencies operate helicopters, and some operate fixed-wing aircraft.

Federal Agencies 
Justice Prisoner and Alien Transportation System
State Department Air Wing

 Arizona
 Phoenix Police Department Air Support Unit

 California
California Highway Patrol Office of Air Operations

LAPD Air Support Division
Los Angeles County Sheriff's Aero Bureau

 Colorado
 Denver Police Department helicopter

 Florida
 Marion County Sheriff Aviation Unit - at least four helicopters

 Maryland
 Maryland State Police Aviation Command
 Baltimore County Police Department: 3 AS350B3 helicopters

 Nevada
 Las Vegas Metropolitan Police Department Air Support Unit

 New York
 NYPD Aviation Unit
 Nassau County Police Department Aviation
 Oregon
 Clackamas County Sheriff Air Support Unit - one Cessna 182
 Portland Police Air Support Unit
 Washington County (Oregon) Police Air Support Unit - a single Cessna R172, N575RW
 Oregon State Police Aviation Unit - four fixed-wing Cessnas

 Utah
 Utah Department of Public Safety Aero Bureau (helicopters)
 Virginia
 Virginia State Police 3 airplanes, 7 helicopters
 Fairfax County Police Department Helicopter Division (two helicopters)

 Washington
 King County Sheriff's Office Air Support (three helicopters)
 Pierce County Sheriff's Department Air Operations - two Cessna 206s
 Snohomish County Sheriff's Office Air Support
 Spokane County Sheriff's Office (three helicopters)
 Washington State Patrol: Special Operations Division: Aviation Section

 Wisconsin
 Wisconsin State Patrol Air Support Unit

Disbanded police aviation units

Chiltern Air Support Unit
Western Counties Air Operations Unit

 Nevada Highway Patrol Flight Operations

Border guards and customs services

Police and Border Guard Aviation Group

Air Maritime Exploration Squadron Guardia di Finanza

CBP Office of Air and Marine

Maritime law enforcement agencies

Galician Coast Guard

Icelandic Coast Guard Aeronautical Division

Italian Coast Guard Air Service

USCG Helicopter Interdiction Tactical Squadron

See also 

 Airship Management Services
 Border guard
 Police aviation in the United Kingdom

References

External links 
 Atlanta’s bombing fallout (Law Enforcement News)
 Aviation Units in Large Law Enforcement Agencies Bureau of Justice Statistics
 Blimp to provide convention coverage for police (CNN)
 Defender BN2T-4S operated by Irish Air Corps for Gardai (Irish police force)
 Police Aviation News
 UK Police Air Support Information & Operational Info + Gallery

 
1919 introductions